Meaningless is the debut solo studio album by American singer-songwriter Jon Brion, released in 2001. Initially slated for release on Lava Records, the album was ultimately released independently by Brion on his own "Straight to Cut-Out" label, sold through his website and CD Baby. After being widely unavailable and obscure due to its limited release, in 2022 the album received its first wide release and first pressing on vinyl through Jealous Butcher Records.

Critical reception

Jason Damas of AllMusic observed the influence of Brion's past collaborators, particularly Aimee Mann, in the album's music, while noting that "in reality it is a representation of the purest form of what Brion has given to the production of those other artists' work". He deemed Meaningless to be "a lovely, catchy, and personal pop album on par with (and in many cases, superior to) the albums and artists that he has worked with in the past".

In a 2016 reappraisal of the album, PopMatters critic Dylan J. Montanari wrote that Meaningless "remains the defining document to which Brion aficionados turn to be reminded of the place he has so admirably carved out for himself in the pop landscape".

Track listing

Personnel
Jon Brion performs vocals and instruments on all tracks except "Trouble", which features:
Jim Keltner – drums
Benmont Tench – piano
Greg Leisz – pedal steel guitar
Mary Lynn Rajskub – backing vocals

References

External links
 CD Baby page for Meaningless, including Brion's notes on the songs

2001 albums
Jon Brion albums
Albums produced by Jon Brion
Self-released albums